A flèche is the name given to spires in Gothic architecture. In French the word is applied to any spire, but in English it has the technical meaning of a spirelet or spike on the rooftop of a building. In particular, the spirelets often built atop the crossings of major churches in mediaeval French Gothic architecture are called flèches.

On the ridge of the roof on top of the crossing (the intersection of the nave and the transepts) of a church, flèches were typically light, delicate, timber-framed constructions with a metallic sheath of lead or copper. They are often richly decorated with architectural and sculptural embellishments: tracery, crockets, and miniature buttresses serve to adorn the flèche.

A short spire or flèche surrounded by a parapet is common on churches in Hertfordshire; as a result, this type of flèche is called a Hertfordshire spike.

See also
 Flèche faîtière
 Ridge turret

Notes

Architectural elements
Church architecture